According to a 2009 Pew Research Center report, there are 1,000 Muslims who constitute approximately 0.8% of the population in Bermuda.

Demography 
Most Muslims are of Afro-Bermudian origin and of convert background. Most Muslims live and congregate in Hamilton, where Bermuda's Islamic centers are located.

Mosques
 Muhammad Mosque

References

 
Bermuda